Johnny English is a 2003 spy action comedy film directed by Peter Howitt and written by Neal Purvis, Robert Wade and William Davies. It is a British-French venture produced by StudioCanal and Working Title Films, and distributed by Universal Pictures.

Starring Rowan Atkinson in the title role, Natalie Imbruglia, Ben Miller and John Malkovich, it is the first installment of the Johnny English film series and serves as a parody and homage to the spy genre, mainly the James Bond film series, as well as Atkinson's Mr. Bean character. The character is also related to Atkinson's bumbling spy character from a series of adverts in the United Kingdom for Barclaycard in the 1990s.

Released theatrically in the United States on 18 July 2003, the film met with mixed reviews from critics but was commercially successful and grossed $160 million worldwide against a budget of $40 million. The film was released in the United Kingdom on 11 April 2003 and topped the country's box office for the next three weekends, before being overtaken by X2. It was followed by two sequels, Johnny English Reborn (2011) and Johnny English Strikes Again (2018).

Plot 
Kindhearted but clumsy MI7 agent Johnny English dreams of becoming Agent One. After Agent One and the remaining agents are killed by English's unwitting incompetence, he is the lone surviving agent capable of finishing Agent One's mission.

Assigned to thwart a plot to steal the newly restored Crown Jewels at an event hosted by French prison mogul Pascal Sauvage, English meets the mysterious Lorna Campbell at the jewels' unveiling at the Tower of London. The jewels are stolen during a sudden blackout. English accidentally knocks out the deputy head of security and fights an imaginary assailant to cover his mistakes; he gives a false description of the unseen suspect to MI7 head Pegasus.

English and his assistant Angus Bough follow a tunnel dug beneath the jewel's display case and confront German thieves Dieter Klein and Klaus Vendetta, who escape in a hearse. Having pursued the wrong hearse, English gatecrashes a funeral.

Sauvage is revealed to be Klein and Vendetta's employer, and instructs the thieves to eliminate English. Pegasus does not believe English and Bough's  claims that Sauvage is involved. English and Bough are attacked by Vendetta, who escapes when English mistakenly attacks Bough. English again encounters Campbell and, having seen her at two crime scenes, his suspicions deepen when no record of her can be found.

English and Bough parachute into Sauvage's headquarters and learn that Sauvage, a descendant of Charles Edward Stuart, plans to make himself king using an impostor Archbishop of Canterbury. English observes that the fake Archbishop has a tattoo on his bottom saying Jesus is coming — look busy. Campbell reveals herself to be an Interpol agent tracking Sauvage. English crashes a reception hosted by Sauvage and is removed from the case by Pegasus.

Sauvage scraps his plan to use the fake Archbishop and instead blackmails Queen Elizabeth II to abdicate and erase her line of succession by threatening her corgis. Campbell, now in charge of the assignment, convinces English to travel with her to Sauvage's French château and investigate behind Pegasus's back. English and Campbell learn Sauvage intends to transform mainland Britain into the world's biggest prison. English accidentally blows their cover; he steals an incriminating DVD but accidentally takes the wrong disc before the two agents are captured.

Bough rescues English and Campbell, and the three race to stop Sauvage's coronation. English exposes the Archbishop's bare bottom and discovers by the lack of the expected tattoo that he is genuine. Undeterred, English has Bough play the incriminating DVD, only to find it is bugged footage of himself lip-syncing to ABBA's "Does Your Mother Know" in his underclothes. Having snuck away, English swings back in on a wire to steal St Edward's Crown from the Archbishop. Sauvage attacks English, who drops the crown, falls from the wire, lands on the throne knocking Sauvage off, and is crowned himself. As king, English has Sauvage arrested before restoring Elizabeth to the throne, requesting only a knighthood as reward.

As Sauvage is awaiting trial for high treason and execution, he requests that after he dies, his brain will be donated for schizophrenia research. English and Campbell drive to southern France but English accidentally ejects Campbell from his car whilst attempting to kiss her. She lands in a swimming pool where Bough and a man matching the description of the imaginary assailant are on holiday.

Cast 
 Rowan Atkinson as Johnny English
 Natalie Imbruglia as Lorna Campbell, an INTERPOL agent
 Ben Miller as Angus Bough, English's partner in the field
 John Malkovich as Pascal Sauvage, a French prison owner and descendant of James II
 Oliver Ford Davies as the Archbishop of Canterbury
 Tim Pigott-Smith as Pegasus, the head of MI7
 Kevin McNally as Prime Minister of the United Kingdom
 Douglas McFerran as Carlos Vendetta, one of Sauvage's minions
 Steve Nicolson as Dieter Klein, one of Sauvage's minions
 Tasha de Vasconcelos as the Exotic Woman in English's daydream
 Greg Wise as Agent One, MI7's top agent whose death English is unknowingly responsible for
 Terence Harvey as the Funeral Officer at Agent One's funeral
 Nina Young as Pegasus' Secretary
 Rowland Davies as Sir Anthony Chevenix, Head of Royal Security
 Philippa Fordham as the Snobby Woman, whom English harasses at the Tower of London ceremony
 Prunella Scales as Queen Elizabeth II
 Tim Berrington as Roger, an MI7 agent who helps discover the identity of the "assailant" at the Tower of London
 Simon Bernstein as the Assailant, who English makes up to cover his error
 Martin Lawton as the Hearse Driver at the funeral English mistakenly crashes
 Neville Phillips as the Priest at the funeral English mistakenly crashes
 Takuya Matsumoto as the Sushi Waiter
 Peter Tenn as the Sushi Bar Customer
 Sam Beazley as the Elderly Man at the Hospital
 Kevin Moore as the Doctor
 Faruk Pruti as the Truth Serum Guard
 Marc Danbury as the Guard that holds Bough at gunpoint in Sauvage's office
 Jack Raymond as the French Reception Waiter
 Jenny Galloway as the Foreign Secretary
 Chris Tarrant as the Radio Announcer at Sauvage's coronation
 James Greene as the Scottish Bishop at Sauvage's coronation
 Clive Graham as the Welsh Bishop at Sauvage's coronation
 Trevor McDonald as the Newsreader, who reveals Sauvage's fate

Additionally, the film's director Peter Howitt played a cameo in the film, as the man Bough threatens to play the DVD at Sauvage's coronation.

Production 
In March 2000, before the release of Maybe Baby, Atkinson signed up to star as a spoof 007, with the news becoming official.

In July 2002, Johnny English principal photography commenced. The film shot for fourteen weeks, filming at Shepperton Studios, on location in London and St. Albans, and finally setting down in Monte Carlo for two days to complete filming the final scene. In September 2002, it was announced that Natalie Imbruglia would star alongside Atkinson.

The character of Johnny English himself is based on a similar character called Richard Latham, who Atkinson played in a series of British television adverts for Barclaycard. The character of Bough (pronounced 'Boff') was retained from the adverts though another actor, Henry Naylor, played the part in the ads. Some of the gags from the adverts made it into the film, including English incorrectly identifying a waiter, and inadvertently shooting himself with a tranquilliser ballpoint pen.

Filming locations 

 Some scenes were filmed at Canary Wharf in London—indeed, the film duplicates the single real tower into two identical ones (albeit on the real site) for the fictional London Hospital and Sauvage's headquarters at 1 Canada Square.
 The scenes set in Westminster Abbey were filmed in St. Albans Abbey: though this connection is solely implied through the dialogue—for this footage is never intercut with footage of the real abbey's exterior. The interior (with the televisual screen hiding the St Albans organ) is clearly St Albans. The choir singing in the coronation scene is St Albans Cathedral Choir.
 Both the exteriors and interiors in the introductory dream sequence scene are in Mentmore Towers.
 The exterior and interior of MI7's headquarters which English enters at the start is Freemasons' Hall, London, which is also used as Thames House (the MI5 headquarters) in Spooks.
 The scenes where Johnny English drives into Dover, Kent along the A20 road (with Dover Castle in the background) and then enters the Port of Dover (with a "Dover Ferry Terminal" sign, Dover's Athol Terrace and the White Cliffs of Dover in the background) to catch a ferry to France, were all shot on location.
 The exterior of Sauvage's French château is actually the castle atop St Michael's Mount in Cornwall.
 The scenes in Brompton Cemetery were filmed there.

Reception 
On Rotten Tomatoes, the film has an approval rating of 33% based on 122 reviews with an average rating of 4.8/10. The site's critical consensus reads, "A tame spy spoof that elicits infrequent chuckles." On Metacritic, the film has a score of 51 out of 100 based on 32 critics, indicating "mixed or average" reviews. Audiences polled by CinemaScore gave the film an average grade of "B" on an A+ to F scale.

Soundtrack 
All tracks were written by Edward Shearmur and performed by London Metropolitan Orchestra unless otherwise noted.
 "A Man for All Seasons" (Hans Zimmer, Robbie Williams) – Robbie Williams
 "Theme from Johnny English" (Howard Goodall)
 "Russian Affairs"
 "A Man of Sophistication"
 "Kismet" (Written by Gay-Yee Westerhoff) – Bond
 "Truck Chase"
 "The Only Ones" – Moloko
 "Parachute Drop"
 "Pascal's Evil Plan"
 "Theme from Johnny English (Salsa Version)" (Howard Goodall) – Bond
 "Off the Case"
 "Cafe Conversation"
 "Into Pascal's Lair"
 "Zadok the Priest" – Handel
 "Does Your Mother Know" – ABBA
 "For England"
 "Riviera Highway"
 "Agent No. 1"

Home media 
Johnny English was released on VHS on 11 August 2003 and on DVD on 11 January 2004. A DVD re-release, entitled Johnny English: Fully Loaded Edition, was released on 19 September 2011, including bonus material about its sequel Johnny English Reborn.

The film was released on Blu-ray on 28 February 2012, along with its sequel Johnny English Reborn. The film was released on Netflix in February 2016.

Sequels 

A sequel, titled Johnny English Reborn, was released in October 2011. In September 2010, filming for the sequel began, seven years after the release of the original, and concluded in March 2011. The film follows Johnny English, now training in Asia after being disgraced in an earlier mission, as he attempts to foil a plot to assassinate the Chinese Premier, while a mole is found in "MI7" and English has to deal with being framed.

In May 2017, it was announced that pre-production had begun on a third film titled, Johnny English Strikes Again, which was released on 5 October 2018.

Notes

See also
Outline of James Bond
List of British films of 2003
Austin Powers: International Man of Mystery, a 1997 comedy film similarly lampooning the spy genre

References

External links 

 
 

2003 films
2003 action comedy films
2000s adventure comedy films
2000s parody films
2000s spy comedy films
British action comedy films
British adventure comedy films
British parody films
British spy comedy films
Cultural depictions of Elizabeth II
Fictional secret agents and spies
Film characters introduced in 2003
Films about Catholic priests
Films about royalty
Films critical of the Catholic Church
Films directed by Peter Howitt
Films produced by Eric Fellner
Films produced by Tim Bevan
Films scored by Edward Shearmur
Films set in Kent
Films set in London
Films shot in Buckinghamshire
Films shot in Cornwall
Films shot in Hertfordshire
Films shot in Kent
Films shot in London
Films with screenplays by Neal Purvis and Robert Wade
Films with screenplays by William Davies
Johnny English
Parody films based on James Bond films
StudioCanal films
Universal Pictures films
Working Title Films films
Works based on advertisements
2000s English-language films